The 1949–50 season was Manchester United's 48th season in the Football League. They finished fourth in the First Division and reached the Sixth Round Proper of the FA Cup.

A notable acquisition by the club during this season was 18-year-old goalkeeper Ray Wood, who was signed from Darlington as manager Matt Busby looked to find a younger goalkeeper to provide competition for Jack Crompton and Reg Allen for the 1950s.

First Division

FA Cup

Squad statistics

References

Manchester United F.C. seasons
Manchester United